Jazz Q is a Czech jazz fusion band from Prague. It was established in 1964 in the former Czechoslovakia by musicians Martin Kratochvíl (keyboards) and Jiří Stivín (flute) but didn't gain recognition until the next decade. In 1970, Jazz Q released the jazz-rock album Coniunctio, together with Radim Hladík's Blue Effect. Stivín left the band the same year. Following this, the group took their music in the direction of electric jazz and art rock, with a new lineup that included Luboš Andršt on guitar, Vladimír Padrůněk on bass, and Michal Vrbovec on drums. In 1973, Jazz Q was joined by English blues singer Joan Duggan.

Band members
Current
 Martin Kratochvíl – keyboards

Past
 Jiří Stivín – flute
 Luboš Andršt – guitar
 František Francl – guitar
 Vladimír Padrůněk – bass
 Michal Vrbovec – drums
 Joan Duggan – vocals
 Mirka Křivánková – vocals
 Jana Kratochvílová – vocals
 Alexandr Čihař – bass
 Přemysl Faukner – bass
 Libor Laun – drums
 Pavel Trnavský – drums
 Vladimír Tomek – percussion
 Oskar Petr – vocals
 Zdeněk Fišer – guitar
 Jaromír Helešic – drums

Discography
 Coniunctio (1970)
 Pozorovatelna  (1973)
 Symbiosis (1974)
 Elegie (1976)
 Zvěsti (1978)
 Hodokvas (1979)
 Hvězdoň (1984)
 1974-75 live (1991)
 The Best of Jazz Q (1995)
 Martin Kratochvíl & Jazz Q (2007 – 8-CD box set)
 Znovu (2013)
 Živí Se Diví: Live in Bratislava 1975 (2013)
 Talisman (2016)
 Amulet (2020)

References

External links

 

Czech jazz ensembles
Czech jazz-rock groups
Musical groups established in 1964
1964 establishments in Czechoslovakia